The 2013–14 Season Play-off for the 2013–14 Hong Kong football season was the 2nd season of the tournament. It was held in May 2014. All matches were played at the Mong Kok Stadium in Mong Kok, Kowloon.

The play-off semi-finals were played as single elimination ties, contested by the teams who finished in 2nd and 3rd place in the First Division League table, the winners of the Senior Challenge Shield and the champions of the FA Cup. The winners of the semi-finals go through to the finals, with the winner of the final gaining participation for the 2015 AFC Cup group stage.

Qualified teams

First Division League

Qualified teams:
 Sun Pegasus
 Royal Southern

Senior Challenge Shield

The winners of the Senior Challenge Shield will guarantee a place in the play-off.

Winners:
 South China

FA Cup

The winners of the FA Cup will guarantee a place in the play-off.

Winners:
 Eastern Salon

Calendar

Bracket

Fixtures and results

Semi-finals

Sun Pegasus vs South China

MATCH OFFICIALS
Assistant referees:
Lam Nai Kei
Chow Chun Kit
Fourth official: Luk Kin Sun
LP Local Player
FP Foreign Player

MATCH RULES
90 minutes.
30 minutes of extra-time if necessary.
Penalty shoot-out if scores still level.
Seven named substitutes
Maximum of 3 substitutions.

Royal Southern vs Eastern Salon

MATCH OFFICIALS
Assistant referees:
Chan Shui Hung
Lam Chi Ho
Fourth official: Chan Ming Siu
LP Local Player
FP Foreign Player

MATCH RULES
90 minutes.
30 minutes of extra-time if necessary.
Penalty shoot-out if scores still level.
Seven named substitutes
Maximum of 3 substitutions.

Sun Pegasus vs South China

Final

Eastern Salon vs South China

MATCH OFFICIALS
Assistant referees:
Lam Nai Kei
Chow Chun Kit
Fourth official: Luk Kin Sun
LP Local Player
FP Foreign Player

MATCH RULES
90 minutes.
30 minutes of extra-time if necessary.
Penalty shoot-out if scores still level.
Seven named substitutes
Maximum of 3 substitutions.

References

External links
 Season Playoff - Hong Kong Football Association

Football competitions in Hong Kong
Season Play-off